Mirna Mazić (born 24 December 1985 in Zagreb, SFR Yugoslavia) is a Croatian female basketball player, currently playing for Olympiacos. At the 2012 Summer Olympics, she competed for the Croatia women's national basketball team in the women's event.

References

External links
 Profile at eurobasket.com
 
 
 
 

1985 births
Living people
Basketball players from Zagreb
Croatian women's basketball players
Power forwards (basketball)
Olympic basketball players of Croatia
Basketball players at the 2012 Summer Olympics
Olympiacos Women's Basketball players
ŽKK Novi Zagreb players
Mediterranean Games silver medalists for Croatia
Competitors at the 2005 Mediterranean Games
Mediterranean Games bronze medalists for Croatia
Competitors at the 2009 Mediterranean Games
Mediterranean Games medalists in basketball